Ballardong are an indigenous Noongar people of the south western area of Western Australia.

Country
The Ballardong's land encompasses an estimated . Northwards they occupy the Avon River. From York, To the east they extend to Tammin, Kununoppin, Waddouring Hill, and Bencubbin, Toodyay, Goomalling, the Wongan Hills. On their southern flank lays Pingelly and Wickepin. Their western frontier is at the Darling Scarp.

Economy
The Ballardong engaged in mining, quarrying stones to be shaped and sharpened for knives and multibarbed spears at Kalannie Boyangoora, Booyungur.

Alternative names
 Balardong
 Balladong, Ballardon
 Ballerdokking
 Boijangura, Boyangoora, Booyungur (hill people)
 Maiawongi (language name)
 Minang ("south", used by the Kalamaia of the Ballardong and other southern tribes' languages), Boyangoora, Booyungur
 Mudila, Mudilja, Mudi:a (general Kalamaia exonym for the Ballardong and other uncircumcised tribes to their southwest).
 Toode-nunjer (a coastal exonym for the Ballardong, properly, Tu:denyunga (Toodyay men))
 Waljuk
 Warranger
 Warrangul, Warrangle ("koala country". This ethnonym was also applied to the Koreng)

Language
 chungar (Brown man)
 doorda (tame dog)
 maman (father)
 unkan (mother)
 yockine (wild dog)

Source:

Notes

Citations

Sources

Noongar